Belmont is a commune in the Gers department in southwestern France.

Geography
The Auzoue forms most of the commune's western border.

The Guiroue, a tributary of the Osse, forms most of the commune's eastern border.

Population

See also
Communes of the Gers department

References

Communes of Gers